This is a list of species in Pseudobaris, a genus of flower weevils in the family Curculionidae.

Pseudobaris species

 Pseudobaris abrupta Champion, G.C., 1909 c
 Pseudobaris acutipennis Champion, G.C., 1909 c
 Pseudobaris angusta (LeConte, 1868) i c b
 Pseudobaris angustula LeConte, J.L., 1876 c
 Pseudobaris anthracina Casey, T.L., 1892 c
 Pseudobaris apicalis Champion, G.C., 1909 c
 Pseudobaris atitlana Champion, G.C., 1909 c
 Pseudobaris biguttata Champion, G.C., 1909 c
 Pseudobaris binotata Champion, G.C., 1909 c
 Pseudobaris biolleyi Champion, G.C., 1909 c
 Pseudobaris boliviana Hustache, A., 1924 c
 Pseudobaris brevior Casey, 1920 i c
 Pseudobaris caelata Casey, 1892 i c
 Pseudobaris californica Casey, 1920 i c
 Pseudobaris callosipennis Solari & Solari, 1906 c
 Pseudobaris carinipectus Champion, G.C., 1909 c
 Pseudobaris carolinae Casey, 1920 i c
 Pseudobaris conica Hustache, 1951 c
 Pseudobaris connectans Blatchley, 1920 i c
 Pseudobaris corvina (Kirsch, T., 1875) c
 Pseudobaris costaricensis Solari & Solari, 1906 c
 Pseudobaris costirostris Champion, G.C., 1909 c
 Pseudobaris cribripennis Solari & Solari, 1906 c
 Pseudobaris cuprea Hustache, 1951 c
 Pseudobaris curvipes Hustache, 1951 c
 Pseudobaris cylindricollis Casey, 1922 c
 Pseudobaris dentipes Champion, G.C., 1909 c
 Pseudobaris discreta Casey, 1892 i c
 Pseudobaris disparilis Champion, G.C., 1909 c
 Pseudobaris diversa Champion, G.C., 1909 c
 Pseudobaris dividua Champion, G.C., 1909 c
 Pseudobaris farcta (LeConte, 1868) i c b
 Pseudobaris fasciculata Champion, G.C., 1909 c
 Pseudobaris fausta Casey, 1892 i c
 Pseudobaris femoralis Hustache, 1951 c
 Pseudobaris fraterculus Champion, G.C., 1909 c
 Pseudobaris gibbicollis Champion, G.C., 1909 c
 Pseudobaris gibbirostris Casey, 1920 i c
 Pseudobaris gigantea Solari & Solari, 1906 c
 Pseudobaris glabripennis Champion, G.C., 1909 c
 Pseudobaris grandis Hustache, 1951 c
 Pseudobaris guttifer Champion, G.C., 1909 c
 Pseudobaris ibaguena Hustache, 1951 c
 Pseudobaris illini Casey, 1920 i c
 Pseudobaris irregularis Champion, G.C., 1909 c
 Pseudobaris kansana Casey, 1920 i c
 Pseudobaris kirschi Hustache, 1951 c
 Pseudobaris leucostigma Champion, G.C., 1909 c
 Pseudobaris levettei Casey, 1920 i c
 Pseudobaris longicollis Hustache, 1951 c
 Pseudobaris lucens Champion, G.C., 1909 c
 Pseudobaris lucida Champion, G.C., 1909 c
 Pseudobaris luctuosa Casey, 1892 i c
 Pseudobaris lugubris Casey, 1892 i g
 Pseudobaris lustrans Casey, 1920 c
 Pseudobaris minuscula Champion, G.C., 1909 c
 Pseudobaris minuta Hustache, 1924 c
 Pseudobaris missouriana Casey, 1920 i c
 Pseudobaris multiguttata Champion, G.C., 1909 c
 Pseudobaris mutabilis Champion, G.C., 1909 c
 Pseudobaris naevius Champion, G.C., 1909 c
 Pseudobaris nigrina (Say, 1831) i c b
 Pseudobaris niveoguttata Champion, G.C., 1909 c
 Pseudobaris notata Champion, G.C., 1909 c
 Pseudobaris ocellata Solari & Solari, 1906 c
 Pseudobaris octonotata Champion, G.C., 1909 c
 Pseudobaris oscillans Champion, G.C., 1909 c
 Pseudobaris oscitans Casey, 1920 i c
 Pseudobaris ovalipennis Hustache, 1924 c
 Pseudobaris parallelopennis Solari & Solari, 1906 c
 Pseudobaris pectoralis LeConte, 1876 i c b
 Pseudobaris perexigua Champion, G.C., 1909 c
 Pseudobaris plicata Champion, G.C., 1909 c
 Pseudobaris porcina Casey, 1920 i c
 Pseudobaris providens Casey, 1920 i c
 Pseudobaris puncticollis Champion, G.C., 1909 c
 Pseudobaris pusilla LeConte, J.L., 1876 c
 Pseudobaris rabida Casey, 1920 i c
 Pseudobaris rugipennis Champion, G.C., 1909 c
 Pseudobaris santacrucis Hustache, 1924 c
 Pseudobaris satyrica Casey, 1920 i c
 Pseudobaris scabrida Champion, G.C., 1909 c
 Pseudobaris scaeva Casey, 1920 i c
 Pseudobaris senescens Champion, G.C., 1909 c
 Pseudobaris sexguttata Champion, G.C., 1909 c
 Pseudobaris sinuosa Champion, G.C., 1909 c
 Pseudobaris sobrina Blatchley, 1916 i c b
 Pseudobaris sonomae Casey, 1920 i c
 Pseudobaris stigmatica Solari & Solari, 1906 c
 Pseudobaris subcaudata Champion, G.C., 1909 c
 Pseudobaris sublineata Champion, G.C., 1909 c
 Pseudobaris subopaca Hustache, 1951 c
 Pseudobaris subparallela Champion, G.C., 1909 c
 Pseudobaris subrugosa Champion, G.C., 1909 c
 Pseudobaris subscabrosa Champion, G.C., 1909 c
 Pseudobaris suturalis Champion, G.C., 1909 c
 Pseudobaris tibialis Champion, G.C., 1909 c
 Pseudobaris tradita Casey, 1920 i c
 Pseudobaris undulata Casey, 1922 c
 Pseudobaris vacunalis Casey, 1920 i c
 Pseudobaris vafra Casey, 1920 i c
 Pseudobaris verecunda Casey, 1920 i c

Data sources: i = ITIS, c = Catalogue of Life, g = GBIF, b = Bugguide.net

References

Pseudobaris
Articles created by Qbugbot